The 1959 Newfoundland general election was held on 20 August 1959 to elect members of the 32nd General Assembly of Newfoundland. It was won by the Liberal party.

Results

*The CCF supported the Newfoundland Democratic Party which was founded by the Newfoundland Federation of Labour to run candidates as a protest against the Liberal government's decertification of the International Woodworkers of America in the course of a logging strike. The Newfoundland Democratic Party ran eighteen candidates, none of whom was elected. The party went on to become the Newfoundland New Democratic Party in 1961.

** United Newfoundland votes included in "other" total.

References
 

Elections in Newfoundland and Labrador
1959 elections in Canada
1959 in Newfoundland and Labrador
August 1959 events in Canada